JSC "Vostok Aviation Company", sometimes trading as Vostok Airlines, is a Russian regional airline headquartered in Khabarovsk and a subsidiary of UTair Aviation. It operates domestic scheduled and charter passenger services, freight services, air ambulance, air patrol, firefighting, oil rig support as well as other specialized operations. Its main base is Khabarovsk Novy Airport.

History 
Vostok Aviation Company was established and started operations as 264 Squadron of the Far Eastern division of Aeroflot on 15 May 1945. It was incorporated as a joint stock company on 30 June 1993. The airline is owned by Khabarovsk regional administration (51%) and the airline employees (49%).

Fleet 

As of December 2015, the Vostok Aviation Company fleet includes the following aircraft:

5 Antonov An-28
3 Antonov An-38
6 Mil Mi-8T
9 Mil Mi-8MTV-1

References

External links 

 

Airlines of Russia
Former Aeroflot divisions
Airlines established in 1945
Companies based in Khabarovsk Krai